The Philippines national baseball team represents the Philippines in international matches and tournaments. It is organized by the Philippine Amateur Baseball Association.

They were the inaugural champions of the Asian Baseball Championships in 1954 but finished fourth in seven of the next eight editions of the biennial events.

Since their last fourth-place finish in 1973, the national team has struggled in competing against top level Asian national teams such as Japan, Chinese Taipei, and Korea, among others.

They have recently participated in the 2006 Intercontinental Cup, and the 2006 Asian Games. They won the gold medal at the 2005 Southeast Asian Games when they hosted the biennial meet.

History

Early history

Baseball had a long history in the Philippines with the sport's introduction in the islands dating back in 1898. At the inaugural Asian Baseball Championship in 1954, the Philippines managed to finish first.

From the 1960s until the 1970s, baseball was a national pastime in the country. From 1955 until 1971, in all but one of the eight editions of that period, the Philippines finished either third or fourth at the Asian Baseball Championship which was dominated by Japan, South Korea, and Taiwan (later competes as Chinese Taipei). The Philippines last podium finish was in 1971, where it finished third.

2000s

The Philippines participated at the 2003 Asian Baseball Championship which also served as an Olympic qualifier. However it finished fifth. The national team achieved better results at the 2005 Southeast Asian Games, winning the gold medal for the baseball event beating Thailand 11-1 in the final.

In November 2006, the Philippines participated at the Intercontinental Cup were they didn't manage to win a match in 9 games with their best stint being the 5-1 defeat against South Korea in the seventh place game. At the 2006 Asian Games the Philippines did not performed significantly better than at the Intercontinental Cup in terms of standings, finishing last in a competition of six teams. The results of the national team were closer scoring nine runs in five contests.

At the 2007 Asian Baseball Championships preliminary round, the Philippines did not lose a single match winning 2-0 against Pakistan and 4-1 against Hong Kong before drawing with Thailand. Before resuming play at the final round of the Asian Baseball Championship, the Philippines went on to defend their title at the 2007 Southeast Asian Games but suffered a close 5-4 defeat to Thailand who emerged as champions. At the Asian Baseball Championship finals the Philippines did not win a game against the "Big Three" which composes of Japan, South Korea and Chinese Taipei.

Due to the performance of the national team at the 2007 edition of the Asian Baseball Championship, they automatically qualified for the "A" round of the tournament facing Japan, Thailand and Indonesia in their group with the Philippines winning over the latter two teams.

2010s

The national team was inactive in 2010. The national sport association for baseball, PABA has experienced difficulties such as mismanagement, insufficient resources and a national squad had not been assembled. There was a dispute between then PABA President Hector Navasero and other personalities with the national sport association. Marty Eizmendi was asked by Philippine Olympic Committee president Peping Cojuangco to settle the issues faced by PABA. The POC urged for a national baseball team to participate at the 2011 Southeast Asian Games due to baseball being a potential source of a gold medal for the Philippines based on past track records. The POC and PABA later agreed to cooperate and decided organize the very first try-outs in decades. The Philippine national team that participated at the Southeast Asian Games won the gold medal beating host Indonesia by 3-1 in the finals.

In 2012, they later attempted to qualify for the 2013 World Baseball Classic but failed. In late 2013, Navasero died and his son who was also the secretary general called for an election where Eizmendi was appointed as President. Tom Navasero resigned from his post. Eizmendi inherited the management and resource issues affecting the national sports association which affected the national team's stints.

The Philippines defeated Indonesia again at the 2015 East Asia Cup championship in Jakarta by 10-0 qualifying for the 2015 Asian Baseball Championship but withdrew from the continental tournament citing financial issues with the East Asia Cup runners-up participating instead.

At the 2017 World Baseball Classic qualifiers in February 2016, the Philippines was managed by American Tim Hulett. At the 2017 Asian Baseball Championship, the national team, consisting of homegrown players who play in the UAAP, will be led by Egay delos Reyes.

Medal count

International tournament results

World Baseball Classic

Asian Championships

 Champions   Runners up   Third place   Fourth place

Asian Games

 Champions   Runners up   Third place   Fourth place

South East Asian Games

 Champions   Runners up   Third place   Fourth place

Far Eastern Games

 Champions   Runners up   Third place   Fourth place

Current roster

References

External links
 Philippine Baseball Team Roster in the 2006 Asian Games
 Philippine Sports and Entertainment Portal

 
National baseball teams in Asia
Baseball